Shivaramakrishnan Pancharatnam (1934–1969) was an Indian physicist who did significant work in the field of optics. He is noted for his discovery of a type of geometric phase sometimes known as Pancharatnam phase for polarized beams passing through crystals. He was born in Calcutta in West Bengal, India in 1934. He was elected a Fellow of the Indian Academy of Sciences at the early age of 25. He was a reader at the Department of studies in Physics, University of Mysore from 1961–1964. From 1964 until his death in 1969 at the age of 35 he was a Research Fellow of St Catherine's College, Oxford, working in association with George William Series. His publications for this period were mainly concerned with the theory of effects found in experiments on optical pumping, e.g. double refraction in a gas due to spin alignment. Professor Series has written an introduction to the life and work of Pancharatnam. He also prepared, for the Proceedings of the Royal Society, the last three papers from notes left by Pancharatnam.

In 1956, Pancharatnam was studying interference figures produced by light waves in crystal plates, under his advisor C. V. Raman, when he discovered the properties of what is now known as the geometric phase, and which predated Michael Berry's work on the topic from 1983.

References

External links
  Current Science Vol. 67, No. 4, 25 August 1994 Pancharatnam memorial issue

1934 births
1969 deaths
Chandrasekhar family
20th-century Indian physicists
Fellows of the Indian Academy of Sciences
Academic staff of the University of Mysore
Scientists from Kolkata
Indian optical physicists